Palais Royale Building, also known as the Lippman Building, is a historic commercial building located in South Bend, St. Joseph County, Indiana. It was built in 1922 along with the neighboring Palace Theater by the Palace Theater Corporation. It is a three-story, rectangular, Spanish Renaissance Revival-style brick building with finely crafted terra cotta ornamentation. It features a series of monumental semi-elliptical arched windows. The interior originally housed a two-story ballroom. A bombing on January 10, 1935, blew out most of the storefront windows and destroyed the corner suite.

It was listed on the National Register of Historic Places in 1983.

References

External links
Palais Royale Ballroom

Commercial buildings on the National Register of Historic Places in Indiana
Renaissance Revival architecture in Indiana
Commercial buildings completed in 1922
Buildings and structures in South Bend, Indiana
National Register of Historic Places in St. Joseph County, Indiana